Huang Guanyin tea (pronounced ) is a Wuyi oolong with a creamy taste. It can be either tightly rolled like Anxi Oolongs or in strips like conventional Wuyi Oolong.

In China, Guanyin leaves are harvested fresh and green, then soaked, beaten, milled, and the sieved puree set up to make GuanYin LiangFen grass jelly.

See also
 List of Chinese teas

References

Wuyi tea
Oolong tea
Chinese teas
Chinese tea grown in Fujian